A Mary Mary Christmas is the fourth studio album by American duo Mary Mary. It was released by Columbia Records on October 10, 2006 in the United States. The album is a follow-up to their self-titled third album (2005). Produced by Warryn Campbell, it is Mary Mary's first Christmas album and consists of eleven tracks, featuring original songs co-penned with Campbell as well as cover versions of Christmas standards and carols. In 2007, A Mary Mary Christmas was nominated for a Dove Award for Christmas Album of the Year at the 38th GMA Dove Awards.

Critical reception 

Tim Sendra from AllMusic gave A Mary Mary Christmas a three and a half out of five stars rating. He found that "A Mary Mary Christmas is filled with plenty of joy and excitement," also noting: "While A Mary Mary Christmas is a solid addition to the holiday CD blizzard, a few more originals and fewer classics would have made it even more enjoyable."

Track listing
All tracks are produced by Warryn Campbellt.

Charts

Weekly charts

Year-end charts

References

Mary Mary albums
2002 Christmas albums
Christmas albums by American artists
Contemporary R&B Christmas albums
Columbia Records Christmas albums